The Chiayi Jen Wu Temple is a temple dedicated to Baosheng Dadi and located in East District, Chiayi City, Taiwan.

History
The temple was constructed in 1677. Materials for the temple building construction were imported from Fujian.

Transportation
The temple is accessible within walking distance east from Chiayi Station of Taiwan Railways.

See also
 Chiayi Cheng Huang Temple
 Chiayi Confucian Temple
 List of temples in Taiwan
 List of tourist attractions in Taiwan

References

1677 establishments in Taiwan
East District, Chiayi
Religious buildings and structures completed in 1677
Religious buildings and structures in Chiayi City
Taoist temples in Taiwan